nCino is a financial technology company headquartered in Wilmington, North Carolina. The company's cloud-based banking software helps financial institutions to gain efficiencies from digitizing and streamlining processes in commercial banking, small business banking, and retail banking. Pierre Naudé has served as CEO of nCino since its inception. The company's Bank Operating System is used by banks and credit unions with assets ranging from $30 million to $2 trillion. As of 2022, nCino is used in more than 1,750 financial institutions. nCino's customers include TD Bank, Truist Financial, and Santander Bank. nCino's strategic partners include Accenture, Deloitte Digital, PwC and West Monroe Partners.

History
nCino was founded by a team of bankers in 2011. Since then, nCino's Bank Operating System has expanded beyond commercial banking, also addressing small business and retail banking.

In 2013 nCino hosted its first nSight User Conference. In 2015, nCino signed its 100th customer. In 2017, nCino opened its first international office in London, England. In 2018, nCino expanded its global office footprint to Sydney, Australia. nCino closed out the decade strong as it executed on its first two acquisitions, opened an office in Canada, and formed a joint venture to bring the Bank Operating System to the Japanese market. Also in 2019, the company announced the launch of nCino IQ, a suite of artificial intelligence and machine learning software within the Bank Operating System.

Products 
The nCino Bank Operating System spans Commercial, Small Business, and Retail lines of business. The Bank Operating System encompasses the following capabilities: new customer onboarding, digital customer engagement, customer relationship management, deposit account opening, loan origination, underwriting/spreading, loan pricing and profitability optimization, business process automation, document management, portfolio analytics, and compliance and risk management.

SimpleNexus is a homeownership platform uniting the people, systems, and stages of the mortgage process into a seamless end-to-end solution. The SimpleNexus solution set encompasses the following capabilities: 

 Nexus Engagement: helps loan officers build more productive referral partnerships and capitalize early on pre-application customer touchpoints
 Nexus Origination: gives loan officers a robust mobile-first toolset to improve loan production while giving borrowers a streamlined loan application process
 Nexus Closing: eClosing software solution connecting all closing participants
 Nexus Vision: improves visibility and increases productivity with out-of-the-box dashboards, scorecards, and reports for the mortgage industry
 CompenSafe: incentive compensation management platform designed specifically for mortgage lenders

Business and Markets
nCino serves the following countries: United States, Canada, Western Europe, Australia, and Japan. nCino serves those markets from its offices in Wilmington, North Carolina, Salt Lake City, London, Melbourne, Sydney, Tokyo, and Toronto.

Acquisitions 
In July 2019, nCino acquired Visible Equity, a financial analytics and compliance software company based in Salt Lake City, Utah. Visible Equity added the following capabilities to the nCino Bank Operating System: Loan Analytics, Deposit Analytics, Application Analytics, Customer Analytics, ALLL/CECL Compliance Analytics, Fair Lending Analytics. Today, these capabilities are branded as nCino Portfolio Analytics.

In November 2019, nCino announced its second acquisition, that of FinSuite, a software company based in Melbourne, Australia.  FinSuite specialized in process automation software leveraging optical character recognition (OCR) and artificial intelligence (AI) for automating the analysis of complex, unstructured financial statements. nCino has since integrated the FinSuite technology into its Automated Spreading solution.

In January 2022, nCino closed its acquisition of Utah-based company SimpleNexus, a digital homeownership platform designed to improve the home buying and mortgage processes.

Funding and IPO
nCino was originally founded as a majority-owned subsidiary of Live Oak Bancshares, a bank holding company. In 2013, nCino raised $9 million in investment funding from a group of investors that included former Morgan Stanley Chairman and CEO John Mack, Promontory Financial Group CEO Eugene Ludwig, and Live Oak Bank Chairman and CEO Chip Mahan. In 2014, nCino received its Series A investment, a $10 million round, from Wellington Management Company LLP, after it experienced a 206% growth in revenue. In February 2015, nCino secured an additional $29 million in a Series B Financing, led by Insight Venture Partners. In 2018, nCino received a $51 million Series C round of venture funding led by Salesforce Ventures, the corporate investment group of Salesforce. In October 2019, nCino closed its Series D round of funding, a raise of $80 million, led by T. Rowe Price Associates, Inc. Existing investor, Salesforce Ventures, also participated in the Series D round. nCino has been a Salesforce partner since its founding in 2012.

On June 22, 2020, nCino announced that it had filed a Form S-1 with the Securities and Exchange Commission, relating to a proposed initial public offering of its stock. The S-1 filing noted that nCino's revenue in fiscal year 2020 was $138 million, up from $91.5 million in fiscal year 2019.

Philanthropy & Sponsorships
In 2021, nCino donated $1.3 million to the city of Wilmington sports complex park, becoming the official new sponsor. Formerly known as the Cape Fear Regional Sports Park, the park is now named the nCino Sports Park and is scheduled to open in the fall of 2022.

nCino partnered with the Food Bank of Central & Eastern North Carolina in the fall of 2021, pledging to donate $1 million over a five-year period toward a new Hunger Solutions Center.

Awards and recognition
In 2019, nCino was recognized as the top vendor by Aite Group in the analyst firm's report titled "Commercial Loan Origination: Evaluating Vendors That Hone the Tip of the Spear".

In 2019, nCino ranked No. 20 Forbes Cloud 100 List, an annual ranking of private cloud-computing companies in the tech sector.

In 2019, nCino was named as the #1 Best Fintech to Work For by American Banker magazine.

In 2018, nCino ranked No. 24 on the Forbes Cloud 100 List, an annual ranking of private cloud-computing companies in the tech sector.

nCino was named to the Inc. 500, an annual ranking of the fastest growing privately held companies in America, in 2016 and 2017.

Legal issues
Antitrust and Wage Suppression Investigations 

In February 2021, nCino filed a SEC Form 8-K document stating that the company "and certain of its officers and other employees were served with grand jury subpoenas wherein the Antitrust Division of the Department of Justice is seeking documents and information in connection with an investigation of the Company’s hiring and wage practices under US federal antitrust laws."

No more information had been made public. The investigation is assumed to still be ongoing 

Antitrust and Wage Suppression Lawsuit

In March 2022, Live Oak Bank settled for a total of $4.65MM to be paid to all employees of both companies. nCino, in turn, did not sign on to the settlement agreement, and has repudiated allegations in court filings of its own. The nearly 2,000 fintech employees making up the class action suit includes hundreds of people who have been employed at nCino, according to court filings, and nCino-specific litigation will come after the settlement with the other two parties moves through the final approval process.

“They’ve answered the complaint,” Shaver said of nCino, “and the next step is for the court to issue an order starting the discovery process in that case.”

Insider Trading Allegations

In September 2022, nCino's majority owner Insight Ventures as well as the nCino board members were sued by The City of Haileah Employee Retirement System for "using nonpublic information about ongoing discussions between nCino and SimpleNexus to substantially increase its investment and ownership interests in SimpleNexus before the transaction took place."

"The City of Hialeah Employees' Retirement System is suing on behalf of nominal defendant nCino Inc. It names as defendants Insight Venture Partners LLC, its affiliates and members of nCino's board of directors "in connection with the approval of nCino's unfair acquisition of SimpleNexus," according to the lawsuit."

References

Companies based in Wilmington, North Carolina
Software companies based in North Carolina
Software companies established in 2012
American companies established in 2012
2012 establishments in North Carolina
Banking software companies
Companies listed on the Nasdaq
2020 initial public offerings
Software companies of the United States